Jacques Semelin is a French historian and political scientist. Professor at Sciences Po Paris and Senior researcher at the CNRS (Center for International Studies), his main fields are the Holocaust, mass violence, civil resistance and rescue in genocidal situations, more recently, the survival of Jews in France during World War Two. In 1998, he created a pioneering course on genocides and massacres at Sciences Po Paris, where he is still teaching. He is the founder of the Online Encyclopedia of Mass Violence.

Biography 
Jacques Semelin has a transdisciplinary education in contemporary history, social psychology and political science. He obtained his PhD in Contemporary History at the Sorbonne (Paris IV, 1986) and was Post-Doctoral Fellow at Harvard University at the Center for International Affairs (1986–1988). Previously, he was a social and clinical psychologist as a former master graduate from the Paris Institute of Psychology (Paris V - La Sorbonne). After his Harvard post-doc, he joined in 1990 the Centre National de la Recherche Scientifique (C.N.R.S.) as a Research Fellow in Political Science. He started teaching at the Ecole des Hautes études en Sciences Sociales and joined Sciences Po Paris in 1998, where he created a pioneering transdisciplinary course on Genocides and extreme violence.

The thread running through Semelin's work could be summarized as follows: how can "ordinary people" commit extraordinary crimes (genocide) or resist without weapons against authoritarian or totalitarian regimes (civil resistance)?

This is how he devoted his PhD to the comparative analysis of some thirty examples of civil resistance in Nazi Europe, summarized in his book Unarmed Against Hitler (1994), available now in five languages. Following this research, he then inquired about the development of civil resistance in Communist Europe (through media strategies) until the fall of the Berlin Wall. He published his results in a new book: Freedom over the Airwaves (1997, Published in English in 2016 by the International Center on Nonviolent Conflict). In 2014, he received the James Lawson Award for his research, awarded at Tuft University by the International Center of Nonviolent Conflicts.

Meanwhile, Semelin became increasingly engaged in holocaust genocide studies, especially since his visit to Auschwitz. He began to work on his master book on mass violence: Purify and Destroy (2007), available now in eight languages. For this book, he was awarded a prize by the Association Française de Science Politique and received the Figaro-Sciences Po Prize in 2007. In 2008, Semelin founded at Sciences Po massviolence.org, under the sponsorship of Simone Veil and Esther Mujawayo (Rwanda). This online encyclopedia is no longer working for lack of funds but the archives are still available online.

In 2010, Semelin was appointed as consultant to the United Nations for the genocide prevention (Office of political affairs).

Semelin has also initiated a new research program on rescue in genocidal situations. He is co-founder of the Chambon sur Lignon museum (Lieu de mémoire) where Jewish children and adults were saved in France during the Nazi occupation. In 2006, he co-directed an international symposium on genocidal rescue practices at Sciences Po. The proceedings were published in 2010, under the title Resisting Genocide.

Subsequently, Semelin engaged in a study to understand how 75% of Jews in France survived the Holocaust. The resulting book, Persécutions et entraides dans la France occupée (2013), rich in many testimonies of non-deported Jews (French and foreigners) was awarded by Foundation of the Resistance (Prix Phillipe Viannay) and the "Emerald" Prize of the Académie Française. Taking into account the many debates aroused by this book especially with Robert Paxton, Semelin has written an abridged version, updated and reworked, published in 2018 and prefaced by Serge Klarsfeld (reference), under the title The Survival of the Jews in France, 1940–44. This book has been published in English by Oxford University Press (USA) and Hurst (UK) and in German at Wallstein.

In his autobiographical book J'arrive où je suis étranger (2007) (I arrive where I feel a stranger), Jacques Semelin speaks openly about his struggle against an inexorable blindness. In 2016, he also published Je veux croire au soleil, a humorous account of his stay in Montreal as a visually impaired professor, based on anecdotes from everyday life.

Published works

Semelin, Jacques (2002), Non-violence explained to my children, Da Capo Lifelong Books, 

Semelin, Jacques (2016 [1997]), Freedom over the Airwaves: From the Czech Coup to the Fall of the Berlin Wall, International Center On Non-violent Conflict,  
Semelin, Jacques (2019), The survival of the Jews in France, Oxford University Press/Hurst,

On his journey to blindness 

Semelin, Jacques (2007), J’arrive où je suis étranger, Seuil, 
Semelin, Jacques (2016), Je veux croire au soleil, Les Arènes,

References

External links
 Homepage of Semelin, Centre d'études et de recherches internationales
 Homepage of Semelin, École des hautes études en sciences sociales
 Online Encyclopedia of Mass Violence

People from Hauts-de-Seine
1951 births
Living people
20th-century French historians
21st-century French historians
French political scientists
Academic staff of the School for Advanced Studies in the Social Sciences